The Dumbarton Oaks Park is a public park, located in the 3100 block of R Street, Northwest, Washington, D.C., in the Georgetown neighborhood. Access is via
Lovers' Lane from R Street, east of 32nd Street. It is located near Dumbarton Oaks, Montrose Park, and Oak Hill Cemetery.
It is part of the Georgetown Historic District.

History
Robert Woods Bliss and Mildred Barnes Bliss purchased the Dumbarton Oaks estate in 1920, and established the garden. The park is a naturalistic streamside garden area of 27 acres, beyond the 10 acre formal garden, designed by Beatrix Farrand. In 1940, the Blisses gifted Dumbarton Oaks Park to the National Park Service, turning over creative control and upkeep of the plantings located there. Both Montrose Park and Dumbarton Oaks Park were jointly listed on the National Register of Historic Places on May 28, 1967. Montrose Park obtained an individual listing on 2007. In 1998 and 1999, Student Conservation Association groups restored the south stream path. Dumbarton Oaks Park Conservancy has been formed to provide restoration.

See also
Rock Creek Park

References

Further reading
 

External links

Dumbarton Oaks Park at the Cultural Landscape Foundation* 

Parks in Washington, D.C.
Parks on the National Register of Historic Places in Washington, D.C.
Historic American Buildings Survey in Washington, D.C.
Historic American Landscapes Survey in Washington, D.C.
Individually listed contributing properties to historic districts on the National Register in Washington, D.C.
Georgetown (Washington, D.C.)
Rock Creek Park
Protected areas established in 1932
1932 establishments in Washington, D.C.